The following is a list of rulers of Nri. The title of the ruler of Nri is Eze Nri. He held religious and political authority over the Kingdom of Nri.

The Nri culture is believed to stretch back to at least the 13th century, with a traditional foundation by Eri dated 948.
The 15th recorded Eze Nri, Òbalíke, was deposed by the British administration in favour of the "warrant chief" system, but the title continued to be held; the current eze Nri, Ènweleána II Obidiegwu Onyeso, was instated in 1988.

Selection
The eze Nri was chosen by the Nze and Nzemabua (state leadership) and had to be recognized by the general public. Before being crowned, he could not have a living father. The potential eze Nri also had to prove he was the choice of God (Chukwu), Eri (founder of Nri), the ancestors ("ndiichie") and spirits (alusi) through revelations and visions confirmed by diviners. After this, must travel to Aguleri to obtain a lump of clay from the bottom of Omambalathe Anambra River. The clay is used to make the ritual pot (odudu) for the shrine to Nri Menri. After various other rituals such as causing the magical ripening of a fruit palm and undergoing a ritual burial and reviving, the eze Nri was proclaimed and saluted as igwe (meaning "heavenly one").

List of recorded Eze Nri
It is difficult to trace the exact dates for an individual eze Nri, because there was an interregnum after each one's death. During this time, the priests of the eze Nri waited for someone to manifest the signs indicating they were the next priest-king.
The following list is based entirely on  Igbo Civilization: Nri Kingdom & Hegemony by  M. Angulu  Onwuejeogwu (1981).

| Eri948-1041 ||  ||  ||  || 
|-
| Eze Nri Ìfikuánim1043-1089 ||  ||  ||  || 
|-
| Eze Nri Nàmóke1090-1158 |||| Diodo ||||
|-
| Eze Nri Buífè1159-1259 |||| Obeagụ Unified Ọfọ N’alọ Agukwu and Diodo ||||
|-
| Eze Nri Ọmalọ1260–1299 |||| Uruọji ||||
|-
| Eze Nri Jiọfọ I 1300-1390 |||| Uruọji ||||
|-
| Eze Nri Ọmalonyeso1391-1464 |||| Obeagu ||||
|-
| Eze Nri Anyamata1465-1511 |||| Uruọji ||||
|-
| Eze Nri Fenenu1512-1582 |||| Agbadana ||||
|-
| Eze Nri Agụ1583-1676 |||| Obeagu ||||
|-
| Eze Nri Apia and Nri–Alike1677-1700 |||| Both from Uruọji |||| Both died the same day
|-
| Eze Nri Ezimilo1701-1723 |||| Agbadana |||| Assassinated
|-
| Eze Nri Èwenétem1724-1794 |||| Agbadana ||||
|-
| Eze Nri Ènweleána I1795-1886 |||| Obeagu ||||
|-
| Eze Nri Òbalíke1889-1936 ||  || Uruoji ||||
|-
| Eze Nri Jiọfọ II Taabansi Udene1937-1987 |||| Agbadana ||||
|-
| Eze Nri Ènweleána II Obidiegwu Onyeso (MFR)1988-current ||  || Obeagu ||||
|}

See also
 Kingdom of Nri
 Eze
 Igbo-Ukwu
 Nigerian traditional rulers
 List of Igbo Nnewi monarchs

Footnotes

Sources

Nri
Nri

Nigeria-related lists
Igbo warriors